Hans Jørgen Reutz Synnestvedt (20 April 1777 – 12 June 1841) was a Norwegian military officer and politician.

He was an elected to the Norwegian Parliament in 1815, representing the constituency of Romsdals Amt. He was a captain in the army, and resided in Bolsøy near Molde at the time. He sat through only one term. Later, when local government was introduced in Norway, Synnestvedt served as the first mayor of Bolsøy municipality, sitting from 1838 to 1840.

Of his three sons, two became military officers and one became a civil servant.

References

1777 births
1841 deaths
Norwegian Army personnel
Members of the Storting
Mayors of places in Møre og Romsdal